Melbury Bubb is a small village and civil parish in the county of Dorset in South West England, situated approximately  south of the town of Sherborne. It is sited on Cornbrash limestone beneath the chalk hills of the Dorset Downs. This hill used to be the site of a beacon. The first half of the village name derives from maele and burh—Old English for "multi-coloured" and "fortified place"—and the second half is a manorial name which derives either from a Saxon resident named 'Bubba' or from medieval lords of the manor. Dorset County Council's latest (2013) estimate of the parish population is 40.

The parish church of St Mary has a 15th-century tower but the rest of the building was largely rebuilt in a 19th-century restoration. Its font however is carved out of the column of an upturned Saxon cross; it is elaborately carved, although the carvings are upside-down.

Notes

External links

Hamlets in Dorset